Petty is an unincorporated community in Lamar County, Texas, United States.

The community has the name of a pioneer citizen.

The Chisum Independent School District serves area students.

References

Unincorporated communities in Texas
Unincorporated communities in Lamar County, Texas